This is list of Acts of the Scottish Parliament from its establishment in 1999 up until the present.

 List of Acts of the Scottish Parliament from 1999
 List of Acts of the Scottish Parliament from 2000
 List of Acts of the Scottish Parliament from 2001
 List of Acts of the Scottish Parliament from 2002
 List of Acts of the Scottish Parliament from 2003
 List of Acts of the Scottish Parliament from 2004
 List of Acts of the Scottish Parliament from 2005
 List of Acts of the Scottish Parliament from 2006
 List of Acts of the Scottish Parliament from 2007
 List of Acts of the Scottish Parliament from 2008
 List of Acts of the Scottish Parliament from 2009
 List of Acts of the Scottish Parliament from 2010
 List of Acts of the Scottish Parliament from 2011
 List of Acts of the Scottish Parliament from 2012
 List of Acts of the Scottish Parliament from 2013
 List of Acts of the Scottish Parliament from 2014
 List of Acts of the Scottish Parliament from 2015
 List of Acts of the Scottish Parliament from 2016
 List of Acts of the Scottish Parliament from 2017
 List of Acts of the Scottish Parliament from 2018
 List of Acts of the Scottish Parliament from 2019
 List of Acts of the Scottish Parliament from 2020
 List of Acts of the Scottish Parliament from 2021
 List of Acts of the Scottish Parliament from 2022
 List of Acts of the Scottish Parliament from 2023